Rebbanasaurus is a small sphenodontian reptile found in the Kota Formation of India. The type specimen is a partial jawbone which has acrodont teeth.

References

Sphenodontia
Jurassic reptiles of Asia
Fossil taxa described in 2001